Hall of Art, Isfahan of Municipality of Isfahan was opened in 2003. It has a main hall with a capacity of 323 people and a side hall with a capacity of 80 people, it is a place for performing the theaters of Isfahan city. About 30 Iranian films and 30 foreign films were screened in this hall for artistic analysis. Conferences and art sessions are held in this hall. 

It was reopened in 2021 after rebuilding.{
  "type": "FeatureCollection",
  "features": [
    {
      "type": "Feature",
      "properties": {},
      "geometry": {
        "type": "Point",
        "coordinates": [
          51.705351,
          32.69284
        ]
      }
    }
  ]
}

WebSite: http://talarhonar.esfahanfarhang.ir/

Instagram: https://www.instagram.com/talarhonar_isfahan/

Aparat: https://www.aparat.com/TalarHonar_Isfahan

Features 
There are also a decoration workshop, five practice plateaus. two makeup rooms, lighting equipment, Black box theater spaces.

References 

Culture in Isfahan